Gosport may refer to:

United Kingdom
Gosport, a town in Hampshire, England
Gosport (UK Parliament constituency)
HMS Gosport, the name of three ships of the Royal Navy
Gosport, Test Valley, a village in the parish of Ampfield, Hampshire, England

Canada
Gosport, Lennox and Addington County, Ontario
Gosport, Northumberland County, Ontario

United States
Gosport, Alabama, town
Gosport, Indiana, town
Gosport, New Hampshire, former town incorporating several of the Isles of Shoals in the Atlantic Ocean; now part of the town of Rye, New Hampshire
Gosport Shipyard, original name of Norfolk Naval Shipyard

Other uses
 Gosport Aircraft Company, a former British aircraft manufacturer based in Gosport, Hampshire.
Gosport tube, a speaking tube used in early aviation for communication between seats of open-air aircraft.